Adam Pavlásek was the defending champion but lost in the semifinals to Gian Marco Moroni.

Henri Laaksonen won the title after defeating Moroni 6–7(2–7), 7–6(7–2), 6–2 in the final.

Seeds
All seeds receive a bye into the second round.

Draw

Finals

Top half

Section 1

Section 2

Bottom half

Section 3

Section 4

References

External links
Main draw
Qualifying draw

Garden Open - Singles
2019 Singles
Garden